Imfura, is a 2017 Rwandan documentary short film directed by Samuel Ishimwe and co-produced by Daniel Schweizer and Jean Perret for Haute École d'Art et de Design (HEAD) and Imitana Productions. The film stars Moses Mwizerwa in lead role along with Kijyana Yves and Nyirababikira Hadidja in supportive roles.

The film received positive reviews and won several awards in international film festivals. It became the first Rwandan production to be included in the competition of Berlinale Shorts. The short won the Silver Bear Jury Price at Berlin International Film Festival.

Plot
The film deals with a story set in a post-genocide Rwanda.

Cast
 Moses Mwizerwa as Gisa
 Kijyana Yves as Gahigi
 Nyirababikira Hadidja as Seraphina

References

External links
 
 Imfura on YouTube

2017 films
Rwandan short documentary films
2017 short documentary films
Rwandan genocide films
Films set in Rwanda